Urošica (fl. 1285 – before 1316) was a Serbian prince and Orthodox monk, a member of the Nemanjić dynasty. He was the younger son of Stefan Dragutin, King of Serbia 1272–1282 and Syrmia 1282–1316. Dragutin kept Syrmia after passing the rule to Stefan Milutin in 1282. Through mother Catherine of the Hungarian Árpád dynasty, the elder son Stefan Vladislav II was the Duke of Slavonia from 1292 and the King of Syrmia from 1316 until 1325.

Life

Family and political background
Urošica was the youngest of three children of Serbian King Stefan Dragutin and Catherine, a Hungarian princess.

There is a theory that Urošica and Urošic are two people.

Dragutin ruled from 1276 until he broke his leg while hunting and became ill in 1282, when the rule was passed to Dragutin's younger brother Stefan Milutin, while Dragutin kept Syrmia as King (1282–1316).

Ladislaus IV died in 1290 leaving no sons, and a civil war between rival candidates Andrew III of Hungary, and Charles Martel of Anjou started. Through mother Catherine of the Hungarian Árpád dynasty, brother Stefan Vladislav II received the duchy of Slavonia in 1292. In 1293, Vladislav married Constanza Morosini, a relative of Andrew III on his maternal side. Charles Martel was supported by Croatian nobleman Paul I Šubić of Bribir, who received the right to Gvozd and Neretva rivers after Charles had managed to assert his rule over parts of Croatia.

His sister Elizabeth married, some time after 1283, Stephen I, Ban of Bosnia (1287–1314), also a Hungarian vassal.

Monastic life

He took monastic vows with the name Stefan, a tradition of the Nemanjić dynasty. The Tavna Monastery on Majevica in Bosnia is thought to be the endowment of Urošica and his brother Vladislav. Some sources claim that the Papraća Monastery located by the Spreča river under the Borogovo mountain was an endowment of the brothers and their father Dragutin.

He died young as a monk sometime before 1316, and was buried in the Saint Achillius Church in Arilje (Serbia), the endowment of his father Dragutin (the church was painted in 1296). Frescoes of him exist at Gračanica, Peć, Visoki Dečani, and Arilje in the narthex on the northern wall. None of the frescoes include the title "Saint".

In 1311, Dragutin launched a campaign to seize the throne to his son; this is thought to have meant Vladislav (although Archbishop Danilo II said Urošic was the possible heir).

Ancestry

Annotations

References

Sources

External links
Fresco of Urošica, Gračanica

1285 births
13th-century Serbian royalty
14th-century Serbian royalty
14th-century Eastern Orthodox clergy
Medieval Serbian Orthodox clergy
Nemanjić dynasty
Serbian saints of the Eastern Orthodox Church
Year of death unknown